CIMB-FM is a First Nation community radio station that operates at 95.1 FM in Pessamit, Quebec.

The station is owned by Radio Ntetemuk.

History

The radio station originally dates back to 1982 which Radio Ntetemuk Inc. received CRTC approval on April 27 of that year to operate a new FM native community radio licence on 95.1 MHz with a power of .6 watts in Betsiamites (now Pessamit), that would broadcast 15% French and 86% in the Montagnais language.

On July 30, 2021, the CRTC approved 
Radio Ntetemuk's application to operate an Innu-, French- and English-language Indigenous (Type B Native) FM radio station in Pessamit, Quebec.

References

External links
 

Imb